The Czechoslovak language was a political sociolinguistic concept used in Czechoslovakia in 1920–1938 for the definition of the state language of the country which proclaimed its independence as the republic of two nations, i.e. ethnic groups, Czechs and Slovaks.

Czech and Slovak languages are two closely related and partially mutually intelligible West Slavic languages; they form their own sub-branch, called the Czech-Slovak languages. In practice, in the international discourse and documents, the role of "Czechoslovak" was played by Czech, while in local speech in public discourse and media, it was generally a form of Czech as spoken in the capital Prague (i.e. either Standard Czech formally or Common Czech informally) with limited introduction of some Slovak vocabulary. Meanwhile, the Constitution of 1920 and its derivative acts allowed the usage of minority languages provided that they were spoken by not less than 20% of the local population of certain areas.

Officially, the 1920 constitution was superseded on 9 May 1948 by the Ninth-of-May Constitution where the concept of the official language was omitted. Czech and Slovak languages became de facto official in the parts of the country where they are spoken by respective ethnic majority, while Czech also preserved the role Czechoslovak had in international affairs.

History 
The Czech-Slav Society (also called the Society for the Czechoslovak Language and Literature) was created in 1829 by students of the Evangelical Lyceum in Bratislava, and became an important entity in the Slovak national movement.

In 1836, Ľudovít Štúr, the leader of the Slovak national revival in the 19th century wrote a letter to the important Czech historian František Palacký. Stating that the Czech language used by the Protestants in Upper Hungary had become incomprehensible for the ordinary Slovaks, Štúr proposed to create a unified Czechoslovak language, provided that the Czechs would be willing to use some Slovak words – just like Slovaks would officially accept some Czech words.

However, in the first half of the 20th century, the radical concept of "Czechoslovakism" set forward the Czech language as the literary norm, while the Slovak language was considered to be a local dialect, as was the Moravian language. The concept of Czechoslovakism was used to justify the establishment of Czechoslovakia to the world, because otherwise the statistical majority of the Czechs as compared to Germans would be rather weak.

Language legislation 
On 29 February 1920, the National Assembly of the First Czechoslovak Republic adopted the Czechoslovak Constitution and, on the same day, a set of constitutional laws. The Language Act (Jazykový zákon) 122/1920 Sb. z. a n., on the grounds of § 129 of the Constitutional Charter (Czech ) has set the principles of the language regulations, where § 1 ruled that the Czechoslovak language "" ('is the state, or official language of the republic').

See also 
Czech language
Slovak language
Comparison of Czech and Slovak
History of the Czech language
History of the Slovak language

Sources 
 
 
 Josef Holub (1933). Stručný slovník etymologický jazyka československého [A Short Etymological Dictionary of the Czechoslovak Language]. Prague: Státní nakladatelství.
  František Cyril Kampelík (1847). Krása a wýbornosti česko-slowenského jazyka, jímžto asi 8 milionů lidí w Čechách a na Morawě, we Slezsku a Slowensku mluwí [The Beauty and Excellence of the Czech-Slovak Language, Spoken by 8 Million People in Bohemia, Moravia, Silesia and Slovakia]. Prague: Tiskem knížecí arcibiskupské knihtiskárny. https://cdk.lib.cas.cz/search/i.jsp?pid=uuid:4d3c8252-239d-43c0-bb4a-ab1011fd9f9e
 Tomasz Kamusella (2007). 'The Political Expediency of Language-Making in Central Europe: The Case of Czechoslovak' (pp 217–222). Studia Slavica / Slovanské Studie [Yearbook, ed. by Jana Raclavská and Aleksandra Wieczorek]. Vol 11. Opole: Wydawnictwo Uniwersytetu Opolskiego and Ostrava: Ostravská univerzita. https://www.academia.edu/34513234/The_Political_Expediency_of_Language-Making_in_Central_Europe_The_Case_of_Czechoslovak_pp_217-222_._2007._Studia_Slavica_Slovanské_Studie_Yearbook_ed._by_Jana_Raclavská_and_Aleksandra_Wieczorek_._Vol_11._Opole_Wydawnictwo_Uniwersytetu_Opolskiego_and_Ostrava_Ostravská_univerzita
 Antonín Macht (1937). Metodika jazyka československého na československých školách národných [The Teaching Methodology of the Czechoslovak Language in Elementary Education]. Olomouc: R. Promberger.
 Antonín Procházka (1947). O vývoji jazyka československého. Příručka k čítance pro pátou třídu středních škol [On the Development of the Czechoslovak Language: An Accompanying Handbook for the Reder for the Fifth Grade of Elementary School]. Prague: Česká grafická Unie.
 Osnovy jazyka československého (jako jazyka vyučovacího) [The Fundamentals of the Czechoslovak Language as a Medium of Instruction]. Prague: Státní nakladatelství.
 Práva jazyka československého v obcích s německou správou [The Rights of the Czechoslovak Language in the Communes with German as a Language of Administration]. Prague: Národní rada československá.
 Miloš Weingart (1919). Vývoj jazyka a písemnictví československého [The Development of Czechoslovak Language and Literature]. Prague: Ministerstvo národnej obrany.

External links
 The Constitutional Charter of Czechoslovak Republic of 1920

References 

Czech language
Slovak language
Languages of the Czech Republic
Languages of Slovakia
Language